Julian Gardner  is an Australian lawyer renowned for his promotion of human rights through the practice of law. In 2015 he was made a Member of the Order of Australia for "significant service to the community through leadership roles with social welfare, mental health, legal aid and other legal organisations".

From February 2000 to April 2007, Gardner was the Public Advocate for the Australian state of Victoria. The Public Advocate is appointed by the Governor of Victoria for seven years. The Advocate protects the legal rights of Victorians over 18 years old with disabilities, often by intervening in court actions, holding and exercising legal guardianship over disabled persons, and/or petitioning other government agencies on behalf of disabled persons.  In 2005, as the Victorian Public Advocate, he made the high-profile decision to allow the removal of Maria Korp's feeding tube, which ultimately resulted in her death.

In 1972, he was one of the founding members of the Fitzroy Legal Service, and from 1975 was its first full time lawyer working as the service's Legal Coordinator. Fitzroy Legal Service is a free legal service for those who cannot afford legal representation. 

He has been the chair or chief executive officer of several public sector agencies and tribunals. They include the first Director Victorian Legal Aid Commission 1980-89; the first Chairperson Victorian WorkCare Appeals Board 1989-92; President Mental Health Review Board 1997-2000; Public Advocate 2000-07. Subsequently he was  Deputy Chair Alfred Health 2010-19; Chair Mind Australia Ltd 2011-18; Vice Chair Australian Press Council 2012-13; Member Ministerial Advisory Panel for Voluntary Assisted Dying 2017-18.Chair Voluntary Assisted Dying Taskforce 2018-19.

The Order of Australia website contains the following biographical notes.
Chair, Mind Australia, since 2011. 
Director, Advance Care Planning and End of Life Care Ltd, since 2011. 
Chair, National Reference Group, Respecting Patients Choice, 2007-2013. 
Board Member, Management Committee, Changemakers Australia, 2007-2012. 
Chair, Expert Advisory Group, Project PRIMeD: Police Responses to the Interface with Mental Disorder, 2008-2011. 
Director, Alfred Health, Melbourne, since 2010. 
Member, Advisory Committee, Senior's Rights Victoria, 2008-2012. 
Victorian Government includes: 
Deputy Chair, Child Protection Practice Standards and Compliance Committee, Department of Human Services, Victoria, 2010-2013. 
Public Advocate, Victorian Office of the Public Advocate, 2000-2007. 
President, Mental Health Review Board, Victoria, 1998-2000. 
Inaugural Chair, WorkCare Appeals Board of Victoria, 1990-1993. 
Inaugural Director, Legal Aid Commission of Victoria, 1981-1990. 
Federal Government includes: 
National Convenor, Commonwealth Social Security Appeal Tribunal, 1994-1997. 
Member, Commonwealth Refugee Review Tribunal, 1993-1994. 
Professional service includes: 
Chair, Advisory Board, Centre for the Advancement of Law and Mental Health, Monash University, 2012-2013. 
Vice-Chair, Australian Press Council, since 2013. 
Member, Advisory Committee, Institute of Social Participation, La Trobe University, 2010-2012. 
Board Member, Faculty of Law, University of Melbourne, 2002-2011. 
Chair, International House (IH) Council, Melbourne University, 1993-2000; Chair, IH Executive and Finance Committee, 1988-1993 and Fellow, since 2001. 
Committee Member, Australian and New Zealand Association of Psychiatrists, Psychologists and the Law, 1997-2010. 
Fellow, Institute of Public Administration Australia (Victoria), since 1999. 
Founding Chair, Victorian Chapter, Australian Institute of Administrative Law, 1992-1995.

References

Living people
20th-century Australian lawyers
Year of birth missing (living people)
21st-century Australian lawyers